Rosa Pompanin (born 9 June 1984 in Pieve di Cadore, Belluno, Veneto, Italy) is an Italian curler. She is a three-time Italian women's champion (2002, 2004, 2005).

She participated in the 2006 Winter Olympics, where the Italian team finished in tenth place.

Teams

Women's

Mixed

References

External links

Living people
1984 births
Sportspeople from the Province of Belluno
Italian female curlers
Olympic curlers of Italy
Curlers at the 2006 Winter Olympics
Italian curling champions
Competitors at the 2003 Winter Universiade
Competitors at the 2007 Winter Universiade